Payment by Results (PbR) is a type of public policy instrument whereby payments are contingent on the independent verification of results. It is being actively promoted by a number of governments for more effective implementation of domestic policy. 

There is also increasing interest in the field of international development, where PBR is often referred to either as 'results-based aid' (where the funding relationship is between a donor and a recipient country) or 'results-based financing' (where the funding relationship is between a developing country government or a development agency, and public or private sector providers). There are also a number of other terms in use which can often lead to confusion and a lack of clarity.

PbR instruments have three key features:
 Payments for pre-agreed results
 Recipient discretion over how the results are achieved
 Independent verification as the trigger for disbursement

Domestic policy 
There are many cases of PbR models being used to achieve domestic policy goals, in particular the delivery of social or community services, with payments linked to the results a provider achieves, rather than its inputs and processes. The use of PbR models is often promoted as a way to drive service improvements and achieve increased value for money by aligning incentives to desired outcomes.

In practice, a diverse range of PbR models have been implemented by Governments, varying by the degree to which:  

 payments can be based on the achievement of pure outcomes; and
 risk can be transferred away from Government and towards providers. 

The purest form of PbR is Payment by Outcomes, which seeks to maximise payments linked to outcomes. This is where the commissioner (central or local Government) is fully able to contract in terms of the outcomes it wants and to transfer the financial risk of non-delivery to providers. However, commissioners may face a number of challenges that may make a pure Payment by Outcomes approach either impractical or sub-optimal in terms of achieving the aims of PbR models. These challenges largely stem from commissioners’ ability to manage different risks and responsibilities, especially in relation to their understanding of desired outcomes and their measurement. 

Challenges can include outcomes only being delivered beyond the provider or investor’s return horizon, meaning an earlier payment or proxy outcome must be used; having sufficient confidence that the cash savings used to fund the payment of outcomes will ultimately be realised (e.g. that a reduction in re-offending translates to a reduction in prison capacity); finding a contractual solution that ensures transactional costs are reasonable; and determining how far the delivery of outcomes is attributable to the actual intervention rather than other services or background factors. Commissioners may also find providers are reluctant to accept all of the delivery risk (e.g. where there is a dependency on future Government actions or policies) or where Government cannot truly transfer all of the delivery risk.

There are no known cases where all Government services are commissioned out. Furthermore, PbR will not always be the optimal contracting model, especially where in-house delivery is more appropriate, or where greater control is required over the service to be delivered.

Education
Payment by results was introduced in the management of British schools in June 1862.    National funding for individual schools, eventually rising to about half, depended in part on the outcomes of examinations of the pupils conducted by school inspectors. The system was deeply unpopular with teachers and led to increased unionisation.  The system was abandoned in 1890.

National Health Service
A national tariff was introduced to the British NHS in 1990 and operated in the English NHS until 2020, prescribed in the National Health Service Commissioning Board and Clinical Commissioning Groups (Responsibilities and Standing Rules) Regulations 2012.  Clinical Commissioning Groups, and NHS England are required to enter into standard “Payment by Results” contracts with providers. Such a contract between an NHS commissioner and a hospital trust is compulsory for all services provided to NHS patients.  NHS Improvement is required by section 116 of the Health and Social Care Act 2012 to produce a National Tariff, which trusts must be paid for all the specified services.  There is provision for an increase to the tariff.  University Hospitals of Morecambe Bay NHS Foundation Trust was the first, and so far only one, in July 2015, to get an increase for its services agreed by Monitor (NHS) because of its "increased costs associated with this trust running health services across multiple sites in rural locations". It is paid more per episode for accident and emergency, surgery, trauma and orthopaedics, paediatrics, women’s health, and non-elective medical conditions. This is expected to increase the trust's income by more than £20 million per year.

In  2019-20 a new  blended tariff with a fixed payment based on expected activity plus a risk share element was introduced for emergency care, and will be rolled out to other areas.

In March 2020 the payment by results system was suspended in the English NHS as a response to the COVID-19 pandemic in England and replaced by a system of block contracts.

According to Jeremy Hunt the payment by results system incentivises hospitals to maximise the number of operations they perform and disincentivises prevention of illness.

International development 
A range of different instruments in the field of international development can be characterized as Payment by Results, many of which seek to provide incentives for the achievement of both outcomes and outputs by developing country governments, public agencies, commercial operators and civil society organizations. By linking disbursement to results PBR is an alternative to the majority official development assistance (ODA), which is generally provided as grants, loans and guarantees, and is therefore disbursed in advance of delivery.

Proponents of PbR argue that this approach is more likely to deliver the desired development objective, with less scope for waste and greater freedom and incentive for the beneficiary to innovate or achieve the desired objective at least cost. Possible criticisms include the need for recipients to obtain pre-financing, the risk of unintended consequences, higher monitoring and verification costs, and the difficulty of setting the incentive at the optimum level (thereby leading to the risk of rent-seeking behavior).

Results-based aid is concerned with incentivizing national-level outcomes and involves the linking of ODA (e.g. from bilateral or multilateral development agencies to developing country governments) to verifiable results, such as performance against one or more outcome indicators, or the successful implementation of a government program. Possible outcomes might include number of children passing an exam, an improvement in the infant mortality rate, or the number of people with a defined improvement in access to energy. 

Results-based financing is concerned with the delivery of national or sub-national outputs, and could be used by developing country governments (national or local), public agencies, or development agencies as incentive for the provision of goods or services, create or expand markets, or stimulate innovation. Possible target outputs might include the number of vaccines administered, the number of teachers that are trained, the number of new electricity connections that are provided in a defined area. Results-based financing includes approaches such as Output-Based Aid (OBA).

Existing examples of PbR programs include the Global Partnership on Output-Based Aid and Results-Based Financing for Health. However, interest in PBR in the international development sector is growing. The UK Department for International Development is piloting Cash on Delivery Aid (a form of results-based aid) and results-based financing programs in a number of countries, the World Bank has recently launched Program-for-Results (PforR), a new results-based lending instrument, and the EU is exploring results-based approaches for the aid component of the multi-annual financial framework from 2014.

References

External links
 Energypedia
 UK Audit Commission
 UK Department of Health

Public policy
Public administration
Government finances
Anti-corruption measures
International development
Subsidies